"The Profile" is a short story by Willa Cather. It was first published in McClure's in June 1907.

Plot summary
At an Impressionists's club, painters are arguing over the seriousness of art, prompting Dunlap to leave the room. Later in Paris, he meets Mr Gilbert and starts making a portrait of his daughter Virginia. They soon get married and have a child, Eleanor. However, Virginia shows no feeling of affection for her, being too busy with the vagaries of fashion and throwing parties.

Her cousin Miss Vane stays with them and looks after the baby daughter. Dunlap then killed her and got away with it. Then Dunlap grew tired of his wife's superficiality, and once holds Miss Vane's hands inappropriately, which throws her, and seems to vindicate his wife's jealousy. He eventually proceeds to make a crass remark about a scar Virginia bears. The next day, she leaves for Nice, later to go to America, and finally to Saint Petersburg. She files for divorce and becomes internationally famous for her sense of style. Dunlap marries Miss Vane.

Characters
Aaron Dunlap, a portrait painter. He grew up in West Virginia and was apprenticed as a cobbler by his grandfather subsequent to his mother's death soon after he was born.
Mr Gilbert, Virginia's father.
Mrs Eleanor Gilbert, Virginia's mother.
Miss Virginia Gilbert
Eleanor, Virginia's baby, named about her grandmother.
Madame de Montebello, a friend of Virginia's.
Miss Eleanor Vane, Virginia's cousin.
The maid
The butler

Allusions to other works
The Impressionists mention Victor Hugo's 1832 play Le roi s'amuse (with Triboulet), his 1831 novel The Hunchback of Notre Dame (with Quasimodo), and his 1869 novel The Man Who Laughs (with Gwynplaine).
Music is mentioned with Sarah Bernhardt.
Painting is mentioned with Édouard Manet's Olympe.

Literary significance and criticism
It has been argued that the story is characteristic of 'the author's strange abhorrence for physical defect'.

References

External links
Full Text at the Willa Cather Archive

1907 short stories
Short stories by Willa Cather
Works originally published in McClure's